Monedas al Aire is the second studio album of Carlos Varela, released in 1991.

Track listing
All tracks composed by Carlos Varela
"Ahora que los mapas cambian de color" - 7:06
"Enigma del árbol" - 5:53
"Robinson solo en una isla" - 6:05
"Cuchilla en la acera" - 3:17
"Muro" - 5:52
"Todos se roban" - 6:45
"Monedas al aire" - 3:09
"Desde aquel día en que lo dividieron todo" - 5:11
"Como me hicieron a mí" - 6:38
"Guillermo Tell" (en vivo) - 2:54

Personnel
Carlos Varela - vocals, acoustic guitar, musical director
Dagoberto Pedraja - electric guitar
Yadam González - bass guitar
José Mestre - keyboards, arrangements
Elio Villafranca - piano, keyboards, arrangements
Fernando Favier - drums, percussion
Eduardo Piloto - tenor saxophone
Jorge Lopez - alto and soprano saxophone
Roberto Trujillo - trumpet

External links

Carlos Varela Official site

1991 albums
Carlos Varela albums